Pterogrammoides is a genus of flies belonging to the family lesser dung flies.

Species
P. baloghi Papp, 1972
P. indicus Papp, 1989
P. longipennis Papp, 1972
P. poecilosomus Papp, 1972
P. thaii Papp, 1989

References

Sphaeroceridae
Diptera of Asia
Diptera of Australasia
Sphaeroceroidea genera